Forever Amber is a 1947 American adventure drama romance film starring Linda Darnell and Cornel Wilde. It was based on the book of the same title by Kathleen Winsor. It also starred Richard Greene, George Sanders, Glenn Langan, Richard Haydn, and Jessica Tandy.

The film was adapted by Jerome Cady, Philip Dunne and Ring Lardner Jr., and directed by Otto Preminger, who replaced original director John M. Stahl after 39 days of filming and $300,000 of production. The movie was originally budgeted at $4.5 million.

The Hays Office had condemned the novel, but within a month of its publication the film rights had been purchased by 20th Century Fox. The film on its release was initially condemned by the National Legion of Decency.

In 1947, Darnell won the starring role in the highly anticipated film adaptation when the original star, newcomer Peggy Cummins, proved too inexperienced for the role. In the novel, the newborn Amber is so named by her dying mother after the color of her father's eyes. Publicity at the time compared the novel Forever Amber to Gone with the Wind. The search for the actress to portray Amber, a beauty who uses men to make her fortune in 17th-century England, was modeled on the extensive process that led to the casting of Vivien Leigh as Scarlett O'Hara.

The film's score, by composer David Raksin, was nominated for the Oscar for Best Original Music Score.

Plot
In 1644, during the English Civil War, a group of Roundheads pursue a Cavalier's carriage, which pauses to abandon a baby at a farmer's door. The Roundheads kill everyone aboard. The farmer and his wife adopt the infant, whose blanket is embroidered “Amber”.

In 1660, the Restoration of the Monarchy begins. Sixteen-year-old Amber is a strong-willed beauty whose puritanical father has contracted her marriage to a farmer. Amber's dreams of an elegant life seem to come true with the arrival of a group of Cavaliers and the handsome Bruce Carlton: she is smitten. She begs Bruce to take her to London, but despite coaxing from his friend Almsbury, he refuses. Before the men leave for town, Bruce and Amber share a kiss.

Bruce and Almsbury are denied an audience with King Charles II. Back at their London tavern, Amber is waiting. Amber and Bruce begin an affair. He pampers her with new gowns and takes her to the theater. At one performance, Bruce approaches Barbara Villiers, the king's mistress, asking her to persuade Charles to grant him ships for his privateer mission. Distraught at the thought of Bruce leaving, Amber stops Almsbury from warning Bruce that the king has arrived.

Charles later summons Bruce to court. Not wanting his friend to face the king's wrath alone, Almsbury goes with him. However, Charles grants Bruce's requests (to get rid of him as a potential rival) and sends him to Bristol that very night. At the tavern, Amber is sleeping. The next morning, she wakes to find Almsbury packing to return to Almsbury Hall, his ancestral home. The king has restored his rights. Bruce's room is empty. Almsbury tells Amber to go home, but she refuses. She will rise in station and marry Bruce, no matter what.

Almsbury gives her money, from Bruce, but she is soon tricked and lands in Newgate, the debtors' prison, where she discovers that she is carrying Bruce's child. Black Jack Mallet, a highwayman, falls in love with her and helps her escape. They go to Mother Redcap's tavern, where Amber gives birth to a son, little Bruce.

Amber lures fops into alleyways where Black Jack robs them. When Black Jack is killed by the king's guard, Amber flees and is discovered by Captain Rex Morgan. Captain Morgan takes her as his mistress and introduces her to theater friends. Soon, Amber is working as an actress; the Earl of Radcliffe takes an interest in her.

Almsbury, now married, comes to London and tells Amber that Bruce will return soon. Captain Morgan proposes, but she rejects him. She still loves Bruce. She also turns down a chance to dine with the king. Bruce returns, and Amber introduces him to their son, hoping he will want to settle down. This ploy does not work. Morgan finds Bruce and Amber together and challenges Bruce to a duel, saying that Amber is his fiancée. Bruce tries and fails to persuade Morgan to withdraw the challenge. Bruce kills Morgan and, blaming Amber, leaves England.

Amber marries the elderly Earl of Radcliffe, thereby becoming a countess. Bruce's ship returns from the Americas and he has the Black Plague. Amber saves his life by killing a murderous, thieving nurse and lancing a boil on his chest. After Bruce discovers that Amber is married, he sails again for Virginia.

The Great Fire devastates London. Charles II plans to seduce Amber, but Radcliffe locks her in her room at home. While the fire rages in their house, Amber struggles with Radcliffe. A cruelly treated servant overpowers Radcliffe and throws him into the fire, killing him. Amber becomes Charles' mistress.

Bruce visits from Virginia with his wife, Corinna. He wants his son. Amber invites Corinna to dine with her and Charles, hoping that Charles will be attracted to a new face. Charles sees through the plot and allows Corinna to leave unmolested. Realizing that Amber still loves Bruce, Charles ends their relationship.

Bruce asks Amber for custody of their son. Thinking he will choose her, Amber asks the boy to decide. He states that he wants to go to Virginia with his father. Bruce invites Amber to come with them, but she stays and watches, heartbroken, as Bruce takes their son away.

Cast
 Linda Darnell as Amber St. Clair
 Cornel Wilde as Bruce Carlton
 Richard Greene as Lord Harry Almsbury
 George Sanders as King Charles II
 Glenn Langan as Capt. Rex Morgan
 Richard Haydn as Earl of Radcliffe
 Jessica Tandy as Nan Britton
 Anne Revere as Mother Red Cap
 John Russell as Black Jack Mallard
 Jane Ball as Corinne Carlton
 Robert Coote as Sir Thomas Dudley
 Leo G. Carroll as Matt Goodgroome
 Natalie Draper
 Margaret Wycherly as Mrs. Spong
 Alma Kruger as Lady Redmond 
 Lillian Molieri aka Lupe Mayorga as Queen Catherine
 Alan Napier as Landale 
 Ian Keith as Tybalt (uncredited)

Production

Original novel
The film was based on the debut novel by Kathleen Winsor published three years earlier. Macmillan, which had published Gone with the Wind, were excited about the book's commercial possibilities and launched it with an initial run of 175,000 copies. The New York Times called Winsor a "born storyteller". The same paper called the book "one of the most expertly packaged bundles of literature in years". It became a best seller.

The book was banned in a number of countries including Australia.

Development
There was film interest in the book from the moment it reached the publisher. Winsor's agent suggested she not enter a competition MGM were running for novels because the agent felt they could get more than the prize money offered of $125,000.

In November 1944, 20th Century Fox bought the screen rights for $200,000, one of the largest amounts paid for a novel. This money was contingent on Hays Office approval of a screen treatment of the book. (By way of comparison, Edna Ferber received $175,000 for Saratoga Trunk; MGM paid $125,000 for Green Dolphin Street and $200,000 to A. J. Cronin for The Green Years; Ernest Hemingway was paid $150,000 for For Whom the Bell Tolls)."

Script
The following month, Winsor announced she had signed a contract with Fox to work on the script for the film, provide technical advice, and do a screen test. Jerome Cady was going to write the script and William Perlberg would produce.

Cady finished the script by March. Eventually Philip Dunne did the script and John Stahl was assigned to direct. Dunne was one of the studio's top screenwriters and Stahl had just made the hugely popular Leave Her to Heaven for Fox.

Dunne later called the novel "worthless" and believed in any adaptation "it would be foolish to try to recover the intent of the author which is to please that part of the public that likes to lick its lips while reading."

The script had to make a number of changes to get past the censor. "We had to be more straitlaced with Amber than we would with another picture", said Perlberg. ""Everyone is waiting for a chance to jump on us."

Amber's lovers were reduced from over 30 in the novel to five in the film. Winsor had little involvement in the script and the film in the end.

Casting
There was an extensive, well publicised talent search for the performer who would play the lead role along the lines of David O. Selznick's challenge to find an actress to cast as Scarlett O'Hara. In November 1944, Gene Tierney was reported as being the front runner. Maureen O'Hara who was a redhead and under contract to Fox, lobbied hard for the role, even wearing a period dress in the studio commissary. Paulette Goddard also wanted to do the part.

Numerous actresses were tested. Perlberg said he was looking for "a young Vivien Leigh" or "an English Lana Turner." Peggy Cummins, an Irish actress who had been on stage in Junior Miss, was (reportedly) the 37th tested and soon established herself as a favourite in October 1945. Annette Simmonds was also a front runner.

Richard Green, a Fox contract player who had not worked in Hollywood since 1940 due to war service, was an early favourite for the role of Bruce Carlton. James Mason, then starring in the hugely popular The Seventh Veil, was offered the role but turned it down because he thought it was "a silly book" and the "script didn't improve it".

The first actors announced for the film were Reginald Gardiner who was cast as Charles II by December 1945 and Glenn Langan who was cast by January 1946.

In February 1946, Daryl Zanuck of Fox said the lead would be played by Peggy Cummins, with Cornel Wilde (a studio contract star) to play her main love interest. Wilde was, after Tyrone Power, the leading "swashbuckling" style star under contract to Fox at the time. Richard Greene was the other leading contender for the part, and Wilde was under suspension at Fox to a dispute over roles, but Zanuck decided on Wilde, and the suspension was lifted.

Vincent Price was cast in a support role as Lord Almsbury, friend of Bruce Carleton.

Original filming
Filming started in March 1946. The budget was $3 million, making it the most expensive film in the history of Fox. (The previous had been Wilson.) The film was expected to take 103 days of filming and Cummins had to appear in every scene but one. Winsor was paid $85,000 when filming started.

Cummins collapsed on set on March 30 due to illness. Filming was halted two times, reportedly due to illness on Cummins' part. Then on April 30, after 39 days of filming and $1 million had been spent, Fox announced that the shoot would be halted for three months and that Cummins and Stahl would be assigned to other projects. Zanuck, head of Fox, said the film "has failed to measure up to the standards planned."

The reason given later was that it was felt Cummins was very good as the young Amber – she had been extensively tested for these scenes – but looked too young to play Amber as she grew up. In the words of The New York Times "they found that Miss Cummins as grown up seductress looked more like Fluffy wearing her mother's old clothes and smearing on mom's lipstick when she wasn't looking."

Fox did not give up on Cummins and put her into The Late George Apley, Moss Rose and Escape. However, she would leave the studio after three years.

Otto Preminger and Linda Darnell
In June 1946, Fox announced that Otto Preminger would take over from Stahl as director, and that the film would resume production in September. Preminger said he would use the same script as Stahl (which the censor had approved). It was estimated that if none of the Stahl-Cummins footage could be used, it would cost the studio $300,000.

Preminger said the film had been stopped because "somehow all the elements didn't jell". He later said in his memoirs that he did not want to make the film because he disliked the novel but Zanuck forced him under his contract.

He supervised a rewrite of the script by Dunne and Ring Lardner Jr. Dunne later recalled he and Lardner "both had great distaste for the material...  We divided it up because the steam was on... They wanted to get it restarted as soon as possible."

In July, Linda Darnell was announced as Cummins' replacement. "I'm pinching myself", said Darnell. Preminger later said that he did not want Darnell, and would have preferred someone like Lana Turner who he felt could have been borrowed from MGM. However he says Zanuck wanted Darnell. Darnell's casting meant she had to miss out on a role in Captain from Castile; she was replaced by Jean Peters.

By now the budget was up to $4.5 million. Two million went on physical production. Because mostly contract actors were used, the cast only cost $350,000 (sets cost $380,000).

There were other cast changes. Richard Greene (making his first Hollywood film in seven years) replaced Vincent Price. George Sanders replaced Reginald Gardiner as Charles II. John Russell, who the studio was grooming for stardom, was cast as Black Jack Russell.

Wilde was reluctant to return to the film. Fox considered replacing him with Stewart Granger, though this would have been difficult due to Granger's other commitments.

In October, right before filming was to resume, Wilde announced he would not return to the role unless he was given an increase in salary. He was being paid $3,000 a week for forty weeks a year but wanted an arrangement comparable to Betty Grable, who made two films a year at $150,000 a film. Wilde said "My agent said that since I am leading the whole Fox lot in fan mail I should be getting money comparable to that received by the top people at the studio. I am worth much more to the company than I was a year ago [when his contract was renegotiated] and an actor must insure himself against the time when he is no longer wanted." The dispute was ended when the studio increased his salary to $5,000 a week.

Second filming
Filming resumed in October 1946 and ended in March 1947. The budget by the end was $6.5 million.

George Sanders was filming a part in The Ghost and Mrs Muir at the same time.

Release
The film was completed and released in New York in October 1947.

Opening week record
The film played 451 dates in its first week and Fox claimed that it had achieved the biggest box-office opening figures in the entire industry. Variety reported the opening receipts were by far the largest raised by one picture first week since they had been tabulating grosses across the country in 1946. In the 17 theatres they received reports from, they claimed it had grossed slightly better than $700,000.

The film played with increased admission prices compared to most films ($1.20). It set a house record at the Roxy in New York ($180,589). In the following week, Varietys reporting had 27 theatres playing the movie which in total grossed close to $800,000 taking its gross to $1.5 million in two weeks.

Catholic condemnation
The film was condemned by Cardinal Francis Spellman and the Legion of Decency who threatened a boycott of Catholic theatregoers. Fox originally decided to fight the ban claiming the ruling was "harsh" and "unfair" considering all the effort they put in to get the movie past the censors.

The studio changed its mind. A number of changes were made to the film, including adding a prologue which criticised Amber, saying, "the wages of sin is death" and adding an epilogue where Cornel Wilde says "may God have mercy on both of us for our sins." The film was re-released in December 1947.

Accolades
The film is recognized by the American Film Institute in these lists:
 2005: AFI's 100 Years of Film Scores – Nominated

Proposed remake
In 1986, there was speculation Raquel Welch was due to appear in a television miniseries version of the novel. However, the miniseries was never made.

Notes

References

External links

 
 
 
 
 Review of film at Variety
Original novel at Internet Archive

1947 films
1947 romantic drama films
American romantic drama films
Romantic period films
Films based on American novels
Films based on romance novels
Films directed by Otto Preminger
Films scored by David Raksin
Films with screenplays by Philip Dunne
Films set in the 1640s
Films set in the 1660s
Films set in England
20th Century Fox films
Films with screenplays by Ring Lardner Jr.
English Civil War films
Cultural depictions of Charles II of England
Films produced by William Perlberg
Cultural depictions of Barbara Palmer, 1st Duchess of Cleveland
Cultural depictions of Catherine of Braganza
1940s English-language films
1940s American films